Denise Laurence Djengué Epoté, (born 22 November 1954) is a Cameroonian journalist and the head of African reporting for the French television network, TV5 Monde.

She was the first journalist to present the news in French on national public television, Cameroon Television (CTV), which later became known as the Cameroon Radio Television (CRTV).

In January 2022, At the end of the press group’s board of directors, Denise Epoté was appointed three times as Marketing Director of TV5Monde, PCA of TV5Monde USA and PCA of TV5Monde Latin America, taking office on February 1, 2022.

Life
She was born in Nkongsamba, Cameroon on 22 November 1954. Her father, Jean Claude Epoté, was a civil servant and financial controller, and her mother, Mizpah Florina Mbella, worked at the treasury of Douala. Both are now retired.

She was the eldest of a family of two girls and two boys. After her secondary education at Lycée Général Leclerc in Yaounde, Epoté was admitted to the International School of Journalism in Yaoundé, which is known now as the Graduate School of Science and Yaounde Techniques of Information and Communication. In 1991, she married the deputy director of major works, Mr. Durand; they were later divorced.

Career
In 1981, she began her career at Radio Cameroon and in 1985, she became the first female presenter of the Cameroon national chain. With her English-speaking colleague Eric Chinje, the two presented the news from 1985 to 1993. She left the Cameroon Radio Television (CRTV) in 1993, moving to TV5 Monde and Radio France International.

In February 2010, Epoté was honored during the 4th Night of Builders.

Broadcasts
Since 1999, Epoté has hosted a weekly show called "and if you tell me the whole truth." The show is a forum open to all those who are interested in the future of Africa.

In 2009, to celebrate the 10th anniversary of the show, Epoté received the President of Mali, Amadou Toumani Touré; by that time, the program had already presented 200 guests. Since its launch, Epoté has interviewed numerous personalities including Andry Rajoelina, Omar Bongo Ondimba, James Alix Michel, General Mohamed Ould Abdel Aziz, and Aminata Traoré.

She is the head of African reporting for TV5Monde, a French television network, and hosts a program that allows journalists from the French Libération Journal to discuss the news of the continent.

On Sundays, she shares her vision of the African news from the past week through her presentation, "The Week of Denise Epoté," on Radio France Internationale.

In January 2022, At the end of the press group’s board of directors, Denise Epoté was appointed three times as Marketing Director of TV5Monde, PCA of TV5Monde USA and PCA of TV5Monde Latin America, taking office on February 1, 2022.

Awards
In 2014, Epoté was ranked among the hundred most influential figures on the continent in the New African and Forbes Africa rankings.

 2001: Best Journalist Award at the Panafrican Broadcasting Heritage and Achievement Awards
 2006: Knight of the National Order of Merit French  
 2006: Knight of the Cameroonian Order of Merit  
 2006: Officer of Arts and Letters of Burkina Faso
 2006: Knight of the National Order of Merit of Senegal  
 2013: Knight of the Legion of Honor, highest French honorary distinction  
 2013: Prize offered by the people of Medina-Mary in Senegal

See also 
 List of Cameroonians

References

Chevaliers of the Légion d'honneur
Cameroonian journalists
Women television journalists
Cameroonian women journalists
People from Nkongsamba
1954 births
Living people